The rivière des Martres (English: Marten's River) is a tributary of the west bank of the intermediate part of the Malbaie River, flowing in the administrative region of Capitale-Nationale, in the province from Quebec, to Canada. This watercourse crosses the regional county municipalities of:
 Charlevoix Regional County Municipality: in the unorganized territory of Lac-Pikauba;
 Charlevoix-Est: in the unorganized territory of Mont-Élie.

This watercourse crosses the Hautes-Gorges-de-la-Rivière-Malbaie National Park.

The upper part of this valley is served by a secondary forest road connecting west to the valley of the upper Malbaie river. The lower part does not have roads suitable for motor vehicles due to the mountainous terrain. Recreational and tourist activities constitute the main economic activities in this valley in the park area; forestry, second (in the Laurentides wildlife reserve, the upper part of the valley).

Because of the altitude, the surface of the Martres River is generally frozen from the end of November until the beginning of April; however, safe circulation on the ice is generally from the beginning of December until the end of March. The water level of the river varies with the seasons and the precipitation; the spring flood generally occurs in April.

Geography 
The Martres river rises from the Lac de la Loutre landlocked between the mountains, located in a forest area in the territory not organized from Lac-Pikauba. The mouth of this small lake is located to the southwest, at:
  east of a curve in the upper part of the Malbaie River;
  south-east of Moreau Lake;
  south-west of Lac au Porc-Épic;
  north-west of the MRC limit;
  north of downtown Baie-Saint-Paul;
  west of the mouth of the Martres river.

  to the east in an increasingly deep valley, forming a curve towards the north and entering the [[Hautes-Gorges-de-la-Rivière national park] Malbaie]] at the end of the segment (ie the last ), up to the Érables stream (coming from the south). Note: the Érables stream drains a set of bodies of water including lakes des Martres, Malfait, Boivin, Boulianne, des Érables and Thomas;
  the south-east by collecting the discharge (coming from the north) of an unidentified lake, the discharge (coming from the south) of two small lakes and the discharge (coming from the north) of three small lakes, up to the outlet (coming from the north) of a set of lakes including Lac de la Cuvette and Lac Malfait;
  south-east to the limit of the two RCMs where the course curves south to the outlet (coming from the north) of Lac Jean;
  first towards the south, bending towards the east to collect two discharges from lakes (one coming from the southwest, the other coming from the south), up to at the outlet (coming from the northwest) of two small lakes;
  towards the south-east forms a slight curve towards the south, then curving towards the south-east at the end of the segment, until its mouth.

The Martres river flows in a bend on the west bank of the Malbaie river, in the unorganized territory of Lac-Pikauba, in the Hautes-Gorges-de-la-Rivière-Malbaie National Park. This mouth is located at:

  northeast of a mountain peak (altitude: ;
  south of a bend upstream on the Malbaie River;
  north-west of La Malbaie town center.

Toponymy 
This toponym has been known since at least the 1920s. It evokes the American marten, carnivorous mammal of the Mustelidae family, whose fur was much sought after. Since the mid-20th century, due to intensive logging and the increase in the acidity rate of lakes, this mammal has become rarer in this sector.

The toponym "Rivière des Martres" was formalized on December 5, 1968 at the Place Names Bank of the Commission de toponymie du Québec.

Notes and references

Appendices

Related articles 
 Charlevoix-Est, a MRC
 Lac-Pikauba, an unorganized territory
 Mont-Élie, an unorganized territory
 Laurentides Wildlife Reserve
 Hautes-Gorges-de-la-Rivière-Malbaie National Park
 Malbaie River
 St. Lawrence River
 List of rivers of Quebec

External links 

Rivers of Capitale-Nationale
Charlevoix Regional County Municipality
Charlevoix-Est Regional County Municipality
Laurentides Wildlife Reserve